France appeared in two of the ten FIFA Confederations Cups contested and won the competition on both appearances. The team's two titles make them the second most successful team of the competition, only trailing Brazil which won four titles. France won their first Confederations Cup in 2001 having appeared in the competition as a result of winning the FIFA World Cup in 1998 and the UEFA European Championship in 2000. The team defeated Japan 1–0 in the final match. In the following Confederations Cup in 2003, France, appearing in the competition as the host country, once again won the competition, beating Cameroon 1–0 after extra time in the final.

Record

2001 FIFA Confederations Cup

Group A

Knockout stage

Semi-finals

Final

2003 FIFA Confederations Cup

Group A

Knockout stage

Semi-finals

Final

Goal scorers

References

External links
France at UEFA

Countries at the FIFA Confederations Cup
France national football team